Tavis Bailey (born June 1, 1992) is an American discus thrower.

Personal

Bailey was born in Poughkeepsie, New York.  He attended A.L. Brown High School in Kannapolis, North Carolina.  After high school, he received a scholarship to play football and compete on the track team at Lenoir–Rhyne University.  In 2012, he transferred to the University of Tennessee where he finished out his collegiate career.

Career

College
In 2012, during his first year at Tennessee, he placed second in the discus at the SEC Outdoor Championships.  He was the runner-up thrower at the 2015 NCAA Outdoor Championships.

Professional
Bailey qualified for the 2016 Summer Olympics by placing second at the 2016 US Olympic Trials with a throw of 63.42 meters.

References

External links

1992 births
Living people
Sportspeople from Poughkeepsie, New York
People from Kannapolis, North Carolina
Track and field athletes from New York (state)
American male discus throwers
African-American male track and field athletes
Tennessee Volunteers men's track and field athletes
Athletes (track and field) at the 2016 Summer Olympics
Olympic track and field athletes of the United States
21st-century African-American sportspeople